The following is a List of Volvo passenger cars  indexed by year of introduction.

Model history

See also

List of automobiles
List of Volvo engines

References

Volvo